, also known as The Very Lovely Tyrant of Love, is a Japanese comedy manga series by Megane Mihoshi, was serialized online from May 2012 to January 2019 in Flex Comix's Comic Meteor website. It has been collected in fourteen tankōbon volumes. The series follows a high school student named Seiji Aino, who becomes trapped in a polyamorous relationship with four girls: the annoying angel cupid Guri, the violently obsessive Akane Hiyama, the shy but defensive Yuzu Kichougasaki and the sadistic psychopath Shikimi Shiramine. Seiji is tasked with showing Guri how to properly utilize her Kiss Note, which magically brings couples together, and teaching her all about true love. An anime adaptation was announced. It aired from April 6 to June 22, 2017.

Plot
A Kiss Note is a powerful notebook that makes anyone who has their name written together instantly fall in love if they kiss each other regardless of any circumstances. This magical and very familiar item belongs to an angel named Guri whose job as cupid is to create couples. However, she accidentally writes down Seiji Aino, a regular high school student, and unless he kisses someone, Guri will die. She convinces Seiji to go kiss his crush, Akane Hiyama, the school's popular girl, who turns out to harbor even stronger feelings for him, bordering on obsessive and psychotic. Eventually. Akane and Seiji come together, but not before Guri decides that she likes Seiji as well. What seems awesome to most guys becomes hell for Seiji, who just wants a normal relationship with girls.

Characters

Main 

Seiji encountered Guri when she appeared at his front door, cosplaying as a shinigami. She then told him that his name was written in the Kiss Note and if he did not kiss someone within the next 24 hours, she would die and he would remain a virgin for life. He eventually reveals his crush for Akane, only to find out her yandere tendencies. Seiji is a more-or-less levelheaded individual, trying to please all the women around him without hurting them. He, like all the others except for Guri, are minor angels as Guri made them all into a relationship together including Akane's half-sister, Yuzu. meanwhile, Seiji was asked by Guri's father, God to help her search for the meaning of love which he reluctantly agrees due to the conditions on the Kiss Note. As a result, they are all effectively immortal but they will still feel pain and if Guri fails to do her job, the people connected to her will cease to exist altogether. As they spend their daily lives being together, he realized that he already develops feelings towards Akane, Yuzu even Guri herself that linked together as couples in the Kiss Note. After learning some advice from the people he knows throughout his daily life, he managed to confess his true feelings towards Akane, Yuzu and Guri respectively. In the end of the manga, he married Akane, Yuzu and Guri in his wedding ceremony with the support of their families on both sides he recruited three girls in the Aino Family.

An Angel/Cupid. The literal child of God and the former Lady of Hell, Mavuro. Due to this, Guri has the natural tendency to "fall" easier than most angels. She often treats her duty as a Cupid like a joke, forming almost exclusively gay couples due to her love for male romance. However also due to this she goes over her quota for couples to be formed per month. Ironically, despite being a Cupid, she does not understand the concept of Love. In fact, the reason she is a cupid because her father wanted her to try to understand what love is, as that is one requirement for becoming God (God must love everyone). Therefore, Guri's father God asking Seiji to aid her in searching the meaning of love. Despite she once became a Devil and going to Hell due to Seiji's harsh and uncertain feelings towards her, Guri starts to recognize certain emotions when she is reunited back with Seiji and finally realized that she needs Seiji's love towards her after all when being asked by Seiji about her feelings to him thus turning her back into an Angel. Touched by Seiji's confession to her one day, Guri knows that she already found the true love of her life while crying in happiness. In the end of manga, she becomes one of the Seiji's brides along with Akane and Yuzu in the wedding ceremony and joins the Aino family. She is now Guri Aino.

The Class Idol of Seiji's school. Seiji initially had a crush on her prior to the start of the series, but failed to act on such emotions out of the belief that she is out of his league. Upon discovering this, Guri decides to use her as Seiji's lover so that she will not die due to the effects of the Kiss Note. However, Akane approaches him which startles Seiji causing him to reveal his kiss to Guri. This causes Akane to fly into a psychotic rage, as she had noticed his "loving stares" and eventually developed strong feelings for him as well. She begins to accuse him of cheating with her and then stabs Guri in the head, then revealing her immortality. Eventually Guri gets the two to kiss, calming Akane down briefly before aggravating her again by revealing that she added her own name as well. While she does often attack Seiji (mostly for comic relief), it is because she truly loves him and wants him to pay more attention to her. Akane has a habit of pulling out endless number of Gurkha knives hidden in her clothes to fight. She gets extremely violent (sometimes by unconscious reflex) should anyone try and steal Seiji from her, especially Guri and Shikimi. After listening to Seiji's confession together with Yuzu one day, Akane decides to settle down the past and live together peacefully with Yuzu and Guri as well. In the end of manga, she becomes one of Seiji's brides along with Yuzu and Guri in the wedding ceremony and joins the Aino Family. She is now Akane Aino.

Younger half-sister of Akane, sharing the same father. She is in love with Akane, both as a sister and as a woman, although she later also develops more feelings for Seiji as her life goes on. Immensely protective of her sister, Yuzu often stalks Akane wherever she goes (which Akane is fully aware of and pays no mind to). She becomes good friends with Guri and Seiji, despite an initial rocky start. Yuzu is also added into their harem, when Guri adds her name in the Kiss Note to Akane and Seiji's anger. Yuzu possesses the ability to conjure a powerful defensive barrier inherited from her family that can defend her from everything between Akane's Gurkha knives to an oncoming truck. Due to her barrier ability, Yuzu found it difficult to make friends in her youth as her peers feared her for it. Guri becomes fast friends with her, however, after complimenting her ability as cool and later sharing her love for male romance with Yuzu. Although she is shy towards Seiji, Yuzu managed to find the courage to kiss Seiji and gives a Valentine's gift to him. Upon Seiji's confession to her one day, Yuzu bursts into tears of happiness while hugging him together with Akane. In the end of manga, she becomes one of Seiji's brides along with Akane and Guri in the wedding ceremony and joins the Aino Family. She is now Yuzu Aino.

The pink-haired, sadistic, hollow and manipulative cousin of both Akane and Yuzu. Shikimi decides to enter Seiji's school in disguise upon discovering his relationship with Akane and Yuzu. She requests that Guri add her to his harem for the sole reason of gaining the immortality/divine protection due to being partnered to Guri. However, Guri rejects the request because she could tell there was no actual love in her for Seiji. Shikimi's favorite hobby is "afflicting people", as it is what brings her joy more than anything else. A running gag in the series is that Shikimi often angers Akane with her attempts to seduce or kiss Seiji. As the times flies, Shikimi had changed to a better person due to Seiji's forgiveness and a promise between Guri and her. She even befriends with Akane and Yuzu in the end.

Supporting

Seiji's tomboyish younger sister. During their childhood together, Akua was originally far more girly than her present age. She began to change herself however, when Seiji began spending less and less time with her in order to get his attention back. Despite this, Seiji failed to notice her to the point where it developed into animosity against Seiji, much to his confusion. Upon discovering Seiji's newfound harem, her discontent grows further, as she would rather have him to herself. Akua tends to injure Seiji whenever she is irritated with how ignorant Seiji is about her emotions. However, she still cares for him and jumps to defense, when he is insulted.

Guri's boss, a higher level angel who monitors the activities of Cupids under his jurisdiction. Unlike other angels, Coraly usually does not take a physical form on Earth, and often uses the Aino family's pet cat Blue as a vessel since his introduction. Coraly states that he has absolutely no understanding of the Human concept of Love, and has a tendency to refer to humans as lower level beings compared to himself. Coraly has a habit of being very vain about his appearance, especially when he uses his true form. A running gag in the series is that despite Coraly's assertion that his form is beautiful, most people find him scary instead and are unable to look directly at him. The only exception is Akua when she sees his true form for the first time, calling it beautiful to the shock of Seiji and the joy of Coraly, but his cat form still scares her off.

 The current God, also Guri's father. Despite being the highest authority in Heaven, he often slacks off and uses his special television set to view events on earth freely. Has a habit of doting on his daughter and spying on her via his TV. He gives Seiji the mission to teach Guri about love so she can be a proper cupid and eventual God. He claims his wife left him due to loving all beings equally as his job demands.

The current lord of Hell. Originally, Hell was ruled by Guri's mother Mavuro, his predecessor until she left after conceiving Guri. He has an inferiority complex, and considers himself unfit to rule Hell. Despite his pleas that Mavuro remain as the Devil Lord, he fails to convince her before she disappears. This causes him to turn to Guri as a potential successor since she is Mavuro's daughter and seek to drag her down to Hell by any means to accomplish this.

Yuzu's personal attendant and chauffeur assigned to her by her mother, Ameisha. Despite the fact that he is supposed to report on Yuzu's actions to her mother, he often is forced into helping Yuzu stalk Akane. Tsuruoka tends to be very paranoid and prone to panicking over failing to do his job lest he face cruel punishment from Ameisha.

Known by the public in Seiji's hometown as "Stolas the Demon". A sociopathic anthropomorphic penguin with violent tendencies, Stolas has a disturbing obsession with Seiji's younger sister Akua, intending to mate with her. He attacked the two as children but was locked in a cage until he broke out years later to chase down Akua once more. Stolas eventually develops an enmity with Coraly for Akua, being defeated by both after Akua overcomes her fear of him. He returns, being modified by a scientist who gave him a robotic armor and intended to use him as a weapon to destroy couples. This backfired when Stolas recognized Akua and reassumed his lustful agenda on his own, forcing Coraly to fight him once more, and in a final clash uses his divine powers to purify his wicked desires, turning Stolas into a normal penguin. After being returned to the aquarium he is matched with a male penguin by Guri.

Guri's friend and an Angel/Cupid. She first appears to Seiji, Guri and Yuzu after Guri's Kiss Note was burned, reassuring that the couples were still together. Since she wanted to retire and start a family, she gave away her Kiss Note, in the form of a smartphone, so Guri can still perform her duties. 

Guri's mother.

Akane's mother and the Matriarch of the Hiyama assassin clan. Often described as a beautiful yet emotionless woman, Suo fell in love with the same man as Ameisha did. Despite the three-way relationship doing well for some time, when their shared lover disappeared she buried herself in the affairs of her family business out of despair. Like her daughter Akane, Suo keeps a large stash of katanas hidden in her Yukata and is very proficient with them.

Yuzu's mother and the Matriarch of the Kichougasaki clan. In contrast to the Hiyamas, the Kichougasaki clan specializes in guard detail. Ameisha, the Matriarch can only be described as the exact opposite of Suo. Loud, emotional, and far less conservative in dress, she clashes heavily with the stoic Suo. After their shared lover disappeared, Ameisha was hardly fazed by the event, instead choosing to move on without worrying. Ameisha, like her daughter, possesses a similar barrier ability yet with more advanced capabilities such as creating shock waves.

Media

Manga
Written and illustrated by Megane Mihoshi, Love Tyrant was serialized online from May 2012 to January 2019 in Flex Comix Comic Meteor website. As of January 10, 2019, fourteen tankōbon volumes were released.

Anime
The anime is directed by Atsushi Nigorikawa at studio EMT Squared with scripts written by Natsuko Takahashi and Monaca composed the music. The series aired from April 6 to June 22, 2017 on TV Tokyo, BS Japan and other channels. Crunchyroll streamed the series, while Funimation produced an English dub.

Music
Opening Theme
Koi? De ai? De bōkundesu! by Wake Up, Girls!
Ending Theme
(Suki) de Oshiete by smileY inc. (Expect 12)
(Suki) de Oshiete Kuta Sai by Yoshino Aoyama (Episode 12)

Notes

References

External links
 
 

2017 anime television series debuts
Angels in popular culture
Anime series based on manga
Comic Meteor manga
Crunchyroll anime
EMT Squared
Harem anime and manga
Japanese webcomics
Romantic comedy anime and manga
Shōnen manga
TV Tokyo original programming
Webcomics in print